Pimenta filipes is a species of plant in the family Myrtaceae. It is endemic to Cuba.

References

Flora of Cuba
filipes
Vulnerable plants
Taxonomy articles created by Polbot